Yelena Belyakova (born 7 April 1976 in Moscow) is a former pole vaulter from Russia. Her personal best is 4.60 metres, achieved in August 2003 in Tula.

International competitions

References

1976 births
Living people
Athletes from Moscow
Russian female pole vaulters
Olympic female pole vaulters
Olympic athletes of Russia
Athletes (track and field) at the 2000 Summer Olympics
Goodwill Games medalists in athletics
Competitors at the 1998 Goodwill Games
World Athletics Championships athletes for Russia
Russian Athletics Championships winners